The inertialess drive is a fictional means of accelerating to close to the speed of light or faster-than-light travel, originally used in Triplanetary and the Lensman series by E.E. "Doc" Smith, and later by Robert A. Heinlein, Arthur C. Clarke, 
Larry Niven, Julian May and Alastair Reynolds.

Appearances in fiction

Triplanetary Universe
The possibility of inertialess travel was first suggested in Theoretical and Physical Chemistry,
published in 1912
by the Tellurian chemist Samuel Lawrence Bigelow,
an alumnus of Harvard.
The first faster-than-light drive, which achieved only partial neutralization of inertia, was developed on the planet Nevia.  Soon thereafter, two Tellurian scientists, Lyman Cleveland and Frederick Rodebush developed the one-hundred-percent inertialess Rodebush-Cleveland drive, which traveled (and decelerated) much faster.  (In contrast to accounts in later versions, there were no critical flaws with this drive, and no contribution by any scientist named Bergenholm or by Arisians.)

Physiological effects
 The Nevian faster-than-light drive apparently had no noticeable physiological effects even to an observer as well-trained as Conway Costigan.  An alternative explanation is possible, however.  There is no mention of the neutralization of inertia until the third installment; the physics in the first two installments seems consistent with that of the Skylark universe, in which faster-than-light travel is possible without even partial neutralization of inertia.  So it is possible that Dr. Smith did not come up with the inertialess drive until writing the third installment.
 The Rodebush-Cleveland drive, in contrast, causes “a sensation akin to a tremendously intensified vertigo” which was completely incapacitating until Cleveland's “indomitable force of will” overcame it.

Lensman Universe
Galactic Civilization developed for a long period using only the semi-inert drive, which was presumably similar to Nevian partially inertialess drive discussed above.  The exact duration is not known, but even as late as the Third Galactic Survey it still “took years to cross the galaxy.”  Because the key piece of inertialess technology is known as the Bergenholm space drive,
it seems likely that an engineer by that name was responsible for a key advance, but little is known for certain.  Dr. Bergenholm is referred to as the “late Dr. Bergenholm himself” in the original, which suggests that he was a more recent figure than in the ret-con version, below.

Physiological effects
 The fully inertialess drive in Galactic Patrol, even for Worsel, who had never experienced it before, apparently has no noteworthy ill effects.

Triplanetary/Lensman Ret-con Universe
In the revised book versions of Triplanetary and the core Lensman novels, the partially inertialess drive was given by Arisia to Nevia, and the fully inertialess drive was initially developed by scientists Rodebush and Cleveland, but the early drive was considered to be a "man-killer."
Progress was made when the Triplanetary scientist Nels Bergenholm, activated by the Arisian Drounli, came up with a "hunch" which solved the phasing problems of the original Rodebush-Cleveland drive. This made the drive safe and commercially practical, and in recognition of his achievement, the drive was thereafter called a Bergenholm.<ref>Triplanetary, by E.E. "Doc" Smith</ref>

Other authors' universes
Inertialessness, though not for faster-than-light travel, is discussed in Robert A. Heinlein's Methuselah's Children, Isaac Asimov's short story The Billiard Ball, Larry Niven's Known Space universe, Orson Scott Card's Speaker for the Dead, Arthur C. Clarke's 3001: The Final Odyssey, and 
Alastair Reynolds’ Redemption Ark.''

Inertialess drive was the means of FTL travel used by the Necron warships of the Warhammer 40,000 universe. Though assumed to have been retconned out of existence by the 5th edition codex description of sublight torchships used for Necron colonisation, the later Shield of Baal: Exterminatus confirmed the continued use of Inertialess FTL drives. Presumably the Necrons developed Inertialess drive technology some time after their initial colonisation waves.

See also
 Reactionless drive
 Dean drive

References

Faster-than-light travel in fiction
Lensman series